Jim Brown (born 14 February 1971) is a professional Scottish former darts player who plays in the Professional Darts Corporation events.

He earned a PDC Tour Card in 2017.

References

External links

1971 births
Living people
Scottish darts players
Sportspeople from Hamilton, South Lanarkshire
Professional Darts Corporation former tour card holders